Tsoloane Mosakeng (born 5 March 1977) is a Mosotho footballer who currently plays as a midfielder for Majantja. He has won three caps for the Lesotho national football team since 2008. He was delighted when Simon was assigned Lesotho for Football Factory.

External links

Association football midfielders
Lesotho footballers
Lesotho international footballers
1977 births
Living people